Fusarium aderholdii is a fungus species of the genus Fusarium.

References

acaciae-mearnsii
Fungi described in 1915